Amy Williams (born 1982) is a retired skeleton racer.

Amy Williams may also refer to:
 Amy Williams (composer) (born 1969)
 Amy Williams (rugby union) (born 1986), New Zealand rugby union player
 Amy Williams (tennis) (1872–1969), American tennis player
 Amy Williams (basketball) (born 1976), American basketball coach
 Amy Williams (Neighbours) (active since 1988), fictional character from the Australian soap opera Neighbours
 Amy Pond (active since 2010), married name Amy Williams, character in Doctor Who
 Amy Williams (weightlifter) (born 1992), Great Britain weightlifter
 Amy Williams (bowls), Welsh indoor bowler

See also 
 Amy Bess Miller (1912–2003, born Williams), American historian